Cormorant (April 21, 1974 - May 4, 2007) was an American Thoroughbred racehorse and the winner of the 1977 Jersey Derby .

Racing career

Cormorant was purchased for $16,000 and was named after the owner's wife's sailboard. He debuted on June 22, 1976. He had a strong 1976, winning 4 out of 5 races including the October 16, 1976 Nursery Stakes. His winning ways continued into the 1977 season, where he won the Iroquois Handicap and the Grade-3 Bay Shore Stakes in March. He then won the April 9th, 1977, Grade-2 Gotham Stakes. His 7 race winstreak was snapped after a 2nd-place finish at the May 14th, 1977 Grade-2 Withers Stakes.
 On May 21, 1977, he entered the 1977 Preakness Stakes. He finished in 4th place behind Seattle Slew, Iron Constitution and Run Dusty Run as the 2nd favorite at 4:1 odds. He returned just 9 days later when he won the biggest victory of his career - the Grade-1 1977 Jersey Derby on May 30. He defeated For the Moment by 3 1/2 lengths and netted $124,200. He finished his career on June 19, 1977, with a 2nd-place finish at the Grade-2 Ohio Derby.

Stud career
Cormorant descendants include:

c = colt, f = filly

Pedigree

References

1974 racehorse births
2007 racehorse deaths
Thoroughbred family 5-j
Racehorses bred in Kentucky